Laggies (released in the United Kingdom as Say When) is a 2014 American romantic comedy film directed by Lynn Shelton and written by Andrea Seigel. It stars Keira Knightley, Chloë Grace Moretz, Sam Rockwell, Kaitlyn Dever, Jeff Garlin, Ellie Kemper, Mark Webber, and Daniel Zovatto. It premiered at the 2014 Sundance Film Festival on January 17, 2014. The films received positive reviews from critics.

Experiencing a quarter-life crisis, Megan panics when she gets a proposal, then escapes  for a week, hiding out with her new 16-year-old friend Annika, who lives with her single dad.

Plot
Megan (Keira Knightley) is an aimless twenty-eight-year-old living in Seattle, Washington who is in a committed relationship with her high school sweetheart and still close with her high school friends. At her friend Allison's (Ellie Kemper) wedding, her boyfriend unexpectedly proposes. She also sees her father cheating on her mother.

Shocked and confused, she flees and runs into teenager Annika (Chloë Grace Moretz) and her friends outside a grocery store. After buying them alcohol, Megan plays with their skateboard. When they ask her to join them on their night out, she does.

Returning home, Megan's boyfriend suggests that rather than having a big wedding, they elope. She agrees, but delays the wedding by pretending she has a week-long career advice seminar to attend.

Megan receives a call from Annika asking her to pretend to be her absentee mother at a guidance counsellor's meeting. She goes to the meeting, then asks Annika if, in return, she can stay at her house.

Annika is unsuccessful at sneaking Megan into her house, where her single-parent lawyer father Craig (Sam Rockwell) questions Megan about her relationship with his daughter. She lies that there is a one-week gap between her lease expiring and her move into a new apartment. Craig reluctantly allows her to stay and gradually begins to trust her. Annika asks Megan to drive her to her estranged mother's house to see her for the first time in years.

Craig asks Megan out for a drink. When they return—having had more drinks than they planned—they end up having sex. The next morning, he offers to let her stay longer than the week she asked for, but she declines.

Annika, seeing them kiss, tentatively tells Megan that she approves of the relationship. She then finds the engagement ring in her purse. Megan tells her she's engaged, and that Craig has no idea. On the way home from shopping for Annika's prom dress, they begin arguing, Patrick is distracted and crashes the car. He tells Megan he has been drinking the wine she bought for them because he is upset that his parents are sending him to boarding school.

Feeling guilty, Megan tells the police she was the one driving the car. She still has alcohol on her breath from that morning, and is arrested. When Craig arrives to free her, Megan reveals her engagement and that she bought alcohol for his daughter.

Megan's father picks her up at the police station. He says he has confessed his cheating to her mother and they are trying to work things out.

Misty shows up at Megan's door with her white dress she bought and a few other things she'd left in Patrick's car, and tries to convince Megan to go to the prom. When Anthony comes to the door, they tell him Misty is a girl she was mentoring at the seminar. Once he goes back upstairs, Misty gives Megan a prom ticket, urging her to go for Annika's benefit.

Megan continues to lie to her fiancé about where she was for the past week. At the airport, he takes a selfie of them, sending it to their high school friends. Megan, realizing their relationship is stifling her, breaks up with him, unfriends her high school friends, and goes to Annika's prom, where she tells Annika to be honest and pursue Junior, a friend with whom she is in love.

Megan goes to Craig's house and leaves him a box of wine with a note that says, 'Can we try again? Check [Yes] or [No]". She knocks, then hides at the bottom of the steps. Craig answers the door, reads the note, sees Megan at the bottom of the steps, and closes the door. Not to be deterred, she knocks again, then picks up the house key hidden outside—but before she can unlock the door, Craig opens it again and lets her in.

Cast

 Keira Knightley as Megan Burch
 Larissa Schmitz as young Megan Burch
 Chloë Grace Moretz as Annika Hunter
 Sam Rockwell as Craig Hunter
 Ellie Kemper as Allison
 Sarah Lynn Wright as young Allison
 Mark Webber as Anthony
 Phillip Abraham as young Anthony
 Kaitlyn Dever as Misty
 Tiya Sircar as Zareena
 Gretchen Mol as Bethany
 Jeff Garlin as Mr. Birch
 Sara Coates as Savannah
 Rocki DuCharme as young Savannah
 Louis Hobson as Theo
 Kirsten deLohr Helland as Danielle
 Maura Lindsay as young Danielle
 Daniel Zovatto as Junior
 Dylan Arnold as Patrick

Title
The writer and director have explained that choosing the title "Laggies" was a complex decision. Shelton said she had never heard the term before making the film, but that screenwriter Andrea Seigel insisted it was a common term for adult slackers. As the film was made, Shelton realized that no one but Seigel had heard of laggies before, but the title stuck. The film was released in the UK as Say When.

Production
Before Knightley joined the film, Anne Hathaway was attached to lead with Moretz, but left the project due to scheduling conflicts with Interstellar. It was announced in December 2013 that Laggies would be in the 2014 Sundance Film Festival lineup. Principal photography began the first week of June 2013 in Seattle.  Filming took place at 23 locations over a 26-day shoot, and wrapped in early July.

Reception
Laggies received mostly positive reviews. At Rotten Tomatoes, the film has a rating of 65% based on 117 reviews, with an average rating of 6/10. The website's critical consensus states: "Laggies may not do as much with its ideas as it could, but it's buoyed by a winsome performance from Keira Knightley, as well as Lynn Shelton's empathetic direction." On Metacritic, the film has a rating of 63 out of 100 based on reviews from 32 critics, indicating "generally favorable reviews."

References

External links
 

2014 films
2014 romantic comedy films
American romantic comedy films
Films directed by Lynn Shelton
Films shot in Washington (state)
Films set in Seattle
Films shot in Seattle
American independent films
A24 (company) films
Films produced by Steve Golin
2014 independent films
2010s English-language films
2010s American films